David Levi Elkan (1808-1865) was a Jewish German engraver.

Active in Cologne as a book illustrator and artist, he worked on the Cologne Cathedral. During the 1848 Revolution, he was active in the Cologne national guard, fighting for emancipation along with many other Jews.

References

1808 births
1865 deaths
19th-century German Jews
German engravers
Artists from Cologne